Harpalus chalcentus is a species of ground beetle native to Asia. It is found in Japan and northeastern China. It is also found in North and South Korea.

Description
Its head and prothorax is kindoff metallic and greenish in colour. Its pronotum and posterior is reddish in colour. The species femora, labrum, mandibles, tibiae and ventral side is black, while pedipalp, antennae and tarsus is brownish-red. Its wings are developed.

References

chalcentus
Beetles of Asia
Beetles described in 1873